Theater im Rathaus  is a theatre in Essen, North Rhine-Westphalia, Germany.

Theatres in Essen